The women's +67 kg competition at the 2012 Summer Olympics was held on 11 August, at the ExCeL Exhibition Centre.

Competition format
The main bracket consisted of a single elimination tournament, culminating in the gold medal match. Two bronze medals were awarded at the Taekwondo competitions. A repechage was used to determine the bronze medal winners. Every competitor who lost to one of the two finalists competed in the repechage, another single-elimination competition. Each semifinal loser faced the last remaining repechage competitor from the opposite half of the bracket in a bronze medal match.

Schedule
All times are British Summer Time (UTC+1)

Results
On 13 July 2012, the World Taekwondo Federation released the provisional draw which included the top eight seeds for the competition. The remainder of the qualified athletes were randomly drawn on 6 August 2012.

Main Bracket

Repechage

References

Results 

Women's +67 kg
Olymp
Women's events at the 2012 Summer Olympics